Weekend Pass is a 1984 U.S. comedy film written and directed by Lawrence Bassoff, based on a story by Mark Tenser.

Premise
Four Navy recruits fresh from boot camp graduation in San Diego spend a weekend pass together out on the town in Los Angeles before shipping out for further training.

Principal cast
 Patrick Houser as Webster Adams
 Chip McAllister as Bunker Hill
 D.W. Brown as Paul Fricker
 Peter Ellenstein as Lester Gidley
 Pamela Kay Davis as Tina Wells
 Hilary Shapiro as Cindy Hazard 
 Annette Sinclair as Maxine
 Daureen Collodel as Heidi Henderson
 Phil Hartman as Joe Chicago
 Grand L. Bush as Bertram

Production notes
Weekend Pass was shot on location in Los Angeles and Venice Beach, California.

References

External links 

1984 films
1980s sex comedy films
American sex comedy films
Crown International Pictures films
1980s English-language films
Films set in Los Angeles
Films shot in Los Angeles
American independent films
Military humor in film
1984 comedy films
1980s American films